The 2016–17 Formula 4 South East Asia Championship season was the inaugural season of the Formula 4 South East Asia Championship. It began on 5 August at the Sepang International Circuit and finished on 22 January 2017 at the same venue, after 36 races held across six rounds.

The championship was won by Presley Martono.

Drivers

Race calendar and results

An updated race calendar was released on 1 June 2016, which cancelled the round at Kuala Lumpur City Grand Prix. An updated race calendar was released on 28 June 2016, which cancelled the round at Penbay International Circuit.

After the previously scheduled second round in support of the Sepang 1000 km was cancelled, a new revised calendar was released by Formula 4 SEA through their Facebook website, which expanded the calendar to 36 races to be held until January 2017 and added rounds in both the Philippines and Indonesia.

The Clark International Speedway round initially consisted of six-races. However, due to Typhoon Sarika, the final race was abandoned. For the Chang International Circuit, an additional race was run as a compromise.

Championship Standings

The series follows the standard F1 points scoring system with the addition of 1 point for fastest lap and 3 points for pole. The best 30 results out of 36 races counted towards the championship.

Points were awarded as follows:

(key)

Drivers' standings

Rookie Cup

References

External links
 
 

South East Asia
Formula 4 South East Asia Championship
South East Asia
Formula 4 South East Asia Championship
Formula 4 South East Asia Championship
South East Asia F4
South East Asia F4
2016 in Malaysian motorsport
2017 in Malaysian motorsport